Princess Schuck (born September 23, 1987) is a Filipino former actress.

Career 

Schuck started out as a child actor and was one of the child cast of ABS-CBN's Ang TV.

In 1996, she cast in the TV series Familia Zaragoza and appeared in the Star Magic all-star anniversary film Ang TV Movie: The Adarna Adventure.

A year later, she appeared as Camille in "I Hate Boys, I Hate Girls" a special multiple episode installment of the anthology series Flames.

Schuck was part of the 9th batch of actors launched by ABS-CBN in 2000. It featured the reintroduction of former child actors Alwyn Uytingco, Hazel Ann Mendoza, Janus del Prado, Rex Agoncillo and herself as up and coming teen actors.

In 2001, Schuck earned a Best Single Performance by Actress award in the 15th PMPC Star Awards for Television for her appearance in an episode of Pira-pirasong Pangarap.

In 2006, Schuck appeared as Curly in Let's Go!, a cousin of Valerie Garcia's Bangs.

Personal life

Schuck is the eldest child and daughter of Hans Schuck and Gina Carreon.  She has 4 younger siblings; brothers Hans Erard, Prince Justin and King Matthew and sister actress Empress Schuck.

Filmography

Television

Film

Awards and nominations

References

External links
 

1987 births
Living people
Star Magic